Wheatfield Township is one of fifteen townships in Clinton County, Illinois, USA.  As of the 2010 census, its population was 478 and it contained 207 housing units.

Geography

Unincorporated towns
 Stolletown
(This list is based on USGS data and may include former settlements.)

Cemeteries
The township contains these four cemeteries: Rudolph, Saint Felicitas, Saint Peter and Yingst.

Demographics

School districts
 Carlyle Community Unit School District 1
Breese District 12
Central Community High School

Political districts
 Illinois' 19th congressional district
 State House District 102
 State Senate District 51

References
 
 United States Census Bureau 2007 TIGER/Line Shapefiles
 United States National Atlas

External links
 City-Data.com
 Illinois State Archives

Townships in Clinton County, Illinois
Townships in Illinois